This is a list of hospitals in Tanzania.

Tanzania is the largest and second-most populous country in East Africa with a population of 50.1 million people according to the 2017 Projections by the National Bureau of Statistics National Census of 2012. It is a sparsely populated country with a geographically wide distribution of settlements hence presenting a challenge regarding access to hospitals. With its population and an area of 940,000 km2, its population density varies from 12 people per km2 in Lindi to 3,133 people per km2 in Dar es Salaam. There are 31 administrative regions in the country and the list of hospitals will be grouped by regions.

The healthcare system is arranged in a hierarchical structure and the administrative structure is related to the running of the equivalent level of the health facility and where the first line health facility is the dispensary to be built in every village and health center to be built in every ward as is written in The Primary Health Care Development Program (2007–2017). Higher up in the ranking are the district hospitals, regional referral hospitals, zonal referral hospitals and national hospitals. There are some specialized hospitals e.g. the Ocean Road Cancer Institute and Mirembe Psychiatric Hospital.

According to the Health Facilities Register, maintained by the Ministry of Health, Community Development, Gender, Elderly and Children there were 8,497 medical care facilities in the country, 62% of them public. As of 2020, there are 337 hospitals listed in the register.

Arusha Region

Dar es Salaam Region

{| class="wikitable sortable"
!Medichecks Specialised Polyclinic 
!Kinondoni
!Kawe 
!Specialised Polyclinic 
!Private
|-
|
|
|
|
|
|-
|Muhimbili National Hospital
|Ilala
|
|
|Public
|-
|Saifee Hospital Tanzania
|Kinondoni
|
|
|
|-
|Jakaya Kikwete Cardiac Institute
|Ilala
|
|
|
|-
|Ebrahim Haji Charitable Health Centre
|
|
|
|
|-
|Rabininsia Memorial Hospital
|
|
|
|
|-
|Regency Medical Center
|
|
|
|
|-
|AAR Hospital
|
|
|
|
|-
|Aga Khan Hospital, Dar es Salaam
|
|
|
|
|-
|SANITAS Hospital
|
|
|
|
|-
|IMTU Hospital
|
|
|
|
|-
|Temeke Regional Referral Hospital
|
|
|
|
|-
|Mwananyamala Hospital
|
|
|
|
|-
|Ocean Road Cancer Institute
|
|
|
|
|-
|Lugalo Military Hospital
|Kinondoni
|Kawe
|Zonal Referral Hospital
|Military
|-
|Amana Regional Referral Hospital
|
|
|
|
|-
|Kairuki Medical Center
|
|
|
|
|-
|TMJ Medical Center
|
|
|
|
|-
|Mikumi Dar Hospital
|
|
|
|
|-
|Shree Hindu Mandal Hospital
|
|
|
|
|-
|Sali International Hospital
|
|
|
|
|-
|Msasani Peninsula Hospital
|
|
|
|
|-
|Ekenywa Specialized Hospital
|
|
|
|
|-
|Burhani Charitable Hospital
|
|
|
|
|-
|CCBRT Hospital
|Kinondoni
|Msasani
|Zonal Referral Hospital
|NGO
|-
|Dr. K. K. Khan Hospital
|Ilala
|Kisutu
|Hospital
|Priv

Dodoma Region

Kigoma Region
Heri Adventist Hospital

Kilimanjaro Region

Lindi Region

Manyara Region

Mara Region

Mbeya Region

Morogoro Region

Mwanza Region

Pwani Region

Tanga Region

Bumbuli Hospital
Lushoto
private(Lutheran)

Zanzibar

References 

 
Tanzania
Hospitals
Tanzania